Vera Vladimirovna Altayskaya (21 May 1919 – 28 December 1978) was a Soviet actress known for her roles in children's fairy tale films and comedies.

Born in Petrograd, she was the adoptive daughter of Konstantin Altaysky-Korolyov, a poet and translator, and his wife Vera Petrovna, a pianist. In the late 1930s she moved to Moscow, where in 1940 she graduated from drama school at the Mosfilm studio and joined the studio's repertoire of actors. Her first prominent role was in Yuli Raizman's 1942 film Mashenka.

She married Aleksei Konsovsky, a fellow actor, with whom she had a daughter, Svetlana. In recognition of her film work during the 1940s she received the Medal "For Valiant Labour in the Great Patriotic War 1941–1945".

In Mashenka, Altayskaya had played a young beauty, but she later transitioned to character roles. For most of her career, she was typecast as shrewish or matronly characters. She appeared in many children's fairy-tale films, most notably Aleksandr Rou's 1964 film Jack Frost, in which she played a domineering stepmother. She died in Moscow after a brief illness, and her ashes are interred in the columbarium of Vagankovo Cemetery alongside those of her adoptive parents.

Selected filmography
 Tanya (Светлый путь, 1940) as Claudia
 Mashenka (Машенька, 1942) as Vera
 The Ural Front (Большая земля, 1944) as Antonina Ushakova
 It Happened in the Donbass (Это было в Донбассе, 1945) as Marusya Shelkoplyas
 The Liberated Earth (Освобожденная земля, 1946) as Tanya
 Dream of a Cossack (Кавалер золотой звезды, 1951) as Collective Farm Girl (uncredited)
 A Groom from the Other World (Жених с того света, 1958) as Nina Pavlovna
 The Magic Weaver (Марья-искусница, 1959) as Aunt Nepogodushka
 Vechera na khutore bliz Dikanki (Вечера на хуторе близ Диканьки, 1961) as Panas's wife
 Kingdom of Crooked Mirrors (Королевство кривых зеркал, 1963) as Asirk, cook
 Morozko (Морозко, 1964) as Nastenka's stepmother
 Fire, Water, and Brass Pipes (Огонь, вода и медные трубы, 1968) as Baba Yaga's daughter
 Varvara-beauty, long braid (Варвара-краса, длинная коса, 1970) as old-veselushka
 The Golden Horns (Золотые рога, 1973) as Cook

References

External links
 

1919 births
1978 deaths
Burials at Vagankovo Cemetery
Actresses from Saint Petersburg
Soviet film actresses